The United pastoral districts of Moreton, Wide Bay, Burnett and Maranoa, and from 1857 Moreton, Wide Bay, Burnett, Maranoa, Leichhardt and Port Curtis, was an electoral district of the Legislative Assembly in the Australian state of New South Wales created in 1856 and consisted of the pastoral districts around the early settlements of Moreton Bay; Wide Bay, near Maryborough; the Burnett River, near Bundaberg; and the Maranoa region of South-western Queensland. In September 1856 the pastoral districts around the Leichhardt River in the Gulf of Carpentaria region and Port Curtis (Gladstone) were added to the electorate. The district was abolished for the 1859 election and replaced by the separate districts of East Moreton, West Moreton, Burnett (which included Wide Bay) and Leichhardt (which included Port Curtis), while Maranoa became part of Darling Downs. All of these districts became part of Queensland when it was established as a separate colony in late 1859.

Members

Election results

References

Former electoral districts of New South Wales
Electoral districts of New South Wales in the area of Queensland
History of Queensland
Constituencies established in 1856
Constituencies disestablished in 1859
1856 establishments in Australia
1859 disestablishments in Australia